Alyson Williams (born May 11, 1962) is an R&B singer who had a string of hit singles in the late 1980s and early 1990s. Some notable tracks include "Just Call My Name", "Sleep Talk", "My Love Is So Raw" and "I Need Your Lovin".

Career
The daughter of bandleader / trumpeter Bobby Booker, she began her career by singing background vocals for various artists including, Curtis Hairston, Melba Moore ("Love's Coming at Ya"), B. B. & Q. Band, Cashflow, Unlimited Touch, Bobby Brown and Barbara Mitchell before joining the group High Fashion, which also featured Meli'sa Morgan. After they disbanded, Alyson sang with the group the Affair before moving onto a solo career.

Her first single, "Yes We Can Can", was first released on Profile Records in 1986; a release on the Def Jam label followed in 1987. At the label, she established herself as an in demand vocalist, duetting with many of her label mates including Chuck Stanley ("Make You Mine Tonight") and Oran "Juice" Jones ("How to Love Again").

Her first album release and the first R&B female singer signed to Def Jam, she released the album Raw in 1989. The album produced the singles "My Love Is So Raw", featuring rapper Nikki D, and "Sleep Talk". In addition, the single "Just Call My Name" was a hit on the Billboard R&B charts reaching number #4. The song, picked up by many "Quiet storm" formats, is now considered a cult classic and continues to receive airplay. The album also included a duet with the Blue Magic vocalist Ted Mills on "We're Gonna Make It". Her single "I Need Your Lovin'" was also a #8 success in the UK, as well as another R&B hit for her.

Alyson also recorded with Tashan on the track "Do You Wanna Know", taken from his On the Horizon outing, later touring with him in the United Kingdom. In 1991, Alyson recorded "She's Not Your Fool" for the soundtrack to the movie Livin' Large. The track also appeared on her 1991 self-titled album.

Alyson also ventured into acting. In 1986, she portrayed her friend Phyllis Hyman in a musical play called "Thank God, The Beat Goes On", joining the Whispers to tell the story of Hyman's career. She also played the role of Marvin Gaye's mother, Alberta, in a play called "My Brother, Marvin" that was produced by Marvin's sister, Zeola.

Discography

Studio albums

Extended plays
Cooked: The Remix Album (1990, Def Jam)

Singles

References

External links
 Alyson Williams on Soul Tracks
 Discography at Discogs.

Living people
1962 births
20th-century African-American women singers
American contemporary R&B singers
21st-century African-American people
21st-century African-American women